Eleanor Mary Ord Laurie Isserlis (14 January 1919 - 17 March 2009) was a British mammalogist.

Early life
Laurie was born in 1919 to parents Elinor Beatrice Ord and Robert Douglas Laurie. Her father was head of the Zoology Department at Aberystwyth University from 1918 until his retirement in 1940.

Education and career
Laurie was the head of the Mammal Department at the British Museum of Natural History.
She graduated from St Hugh's College, Oxford in 1942 with a Master of Science degree.
In its 1949–1950 issue, the St Hugh's College Chronicle noted that she was appointed Senior Scientific Officer at the British Museum in its Zoology Department.
She became a Fellow of the Linnean Society of London in 1950; she withdrew from the Society in 1958.

Species described
Laurie described a number of new mammal species, including:
Dactylopsila tatei Laurie, 1952
Microperoryctes papuensis (Laurie, 1952)
Hipposideros inexpectatus Laurie & Hill, 1954
Miniopterus shortridgei Laurie & Hill, 1956

Selected publications

Personal life
On 29 December 1949, she married Alexander Reginald Isserlis, who would become Principal Private Secretary to the Prime Minister in 1970. Together, they had two daughters.

Honors
In 2009, Helgen and Helgen named a new species of mouse after Laurie, Pseudohydromys eleanorae, recommending the common name of Laurie's moss mouse.

References

1919 births
2009 deaths
British mammalogists
Alumni of St Hugh's College, Oxford
Women mammalogists
British women biologists
20th-century British zoologists
20th-century British women scientists
Employees of the British Museum
Fellows of the Linnean Society of London